KFXD-TV (channel 6) was a television station in Nampa, Idaho, United States. It was the first television station in the state of Idaho, broadcasting for less than two months in the summer of 1953, between June 18 and August 11. Owned by radio station KFXD (580 AM), it did not have any network affiliation and aired very limited programming. All programs originated from the transmitter site, located at Deer Point in the Boise National Forest.

History
In July 1952, Frank Hurt & Son, Inc., owner of KFXD, filed with the Federal Communications Commission (FCC) to build a new commercial television station on channel 6 in Nampa, proposing a full facility to broadcast at 19,720 watts. The application was granted on March 11, 1953.

After a remarkably low $25,000 investment, the first television test pattern in Idaho made it onto screens as far away as Weiser and Ontario, Oregon, on June 18, with lieutenant governor Edson Deal helping put the station on the air. Commercial programming followed 11 days later, on June 29. The station used a temporary antenna setup that was unusual. Instead of a tower, the transmitter elements were mounted on a large redwood fence facing the Boise Valley.

However, a series of differences between the television and radio businesses put the station in serious peril nearly immediately. Though it was announced shortly before signing on that KFXD-TV would be an ABC affiliate, no such hookup ever materialized. Further, technical necessities prevented the television station from making use of the employees of KFXD radio, whose studios were in downtown Nampa,  from the Deer Point transmitter site. This left KFXD-TV underpowered in terms of programming and personnel. It was a two-man operation, run by station manager Edward P. Hurt and chief engineer Gilbert Rose, and it could only rely on the meager supply of syndicated filmed programming that was available, primarily "30-year-old movies"; further, syndicated television programming was far less profitable than radio. The next month, a far more organized station brought network television to Idaho when KIDO-TV channel 7, an affiliate of CBS, NBC and DuMont, began telecasting on July 12.

On August 11, with KIDO-TV on air and after less than two months of trying, Hurt gave up, possibly because he did not want to lose money and was used to the financial success of KFXD radio. On August 11, the station ceased broadcasting and filed for authority to go silent, though the underlying construction permit remained in force. The final program was the 1935 movie Confidential. In an interview with Broadcasting magazine, Hurt explained that the limited manpower available to him meant that the 500-watt temporary facility that KFXD-TV had utilized had to be dismantled to allow for construction of the station's eventual full technical setup. The design of the station's antenna caused Nampa,  further from the transmitter than Boise, to receive a better signal. To Television Digest, Hurt explained that the station only lost $200 a day because it only operated for two hours daily. The equipment was quickly dismantled and sold; the 500-watt transmitter was used to start up KFXJ-TV in Grand Junction, Colorado.

In late 1953, Hurt filed to sell the KFXD-TV construction permit to Idaho Broadcasting and Television Company, owners of radio station KGEM which had obtained the construction permit to build KTVI on channel 9 and would surrender it to take the KFXD-TV permit. This company had helped KFXD-TV get on air in the first place by providing the interim equipment it used. This was authorized by the FCC in late January 1954. The KTVI call letters followed Idaho Broadcasting and Television Company to channel 6, though the company hesitated to build, concerned that Boise may not be able to support three stations: KIDO-TV, KBOI, and KTVI. It ultimately surrendered the permit, claiming that "the economic situation does not warrant further construction".

In closing down, KFXD-TV was just the second television station in the entire United States, and the first on VHF, to cease operating. It had been preceded by UHF station WROV-TV in Roanoke, Virginia. The channel 6 frequency would later be occupied by KCIX-TV from 1958 to 1960; it too was unable to obtain an affiliation. Finally, channel 6 was occupied by KIVI-TV, which obtained the market's ABC affiliation and continues to broadcast to this day.

References

FXD-TV
1953 establishments in Idaho
1953 disestablishments in Idaho
Television channels and stations disestablished in 1953
Television channels and stations established in 1953
FXD-TV
Defunct television stations in the United States
Nampa, Idaho